Arumbakkam Metro station is a Metro railway station on the Line 2 of the Chennai Metro, which is currently under operation. The station is among the elevated stations coming up along corridor II of the Chennai Metro, Chennai Central–St. Thomas Mount stretch. The station will serve the neighbourhoods of Vinayagapuram, Choolaimedu and MMDA Colony.

Construction history

The station was constructed by Consolidated Constructed Consortium (CCCL). The station attained structural completion in September 2013. The consolidated cost of the station along with the stations of Koyambedu, CMBT, Vadapalani and Ashok Nagar was  1,395.4 million.

The station
The station is being constructed as an elevated station on the arterial Inner Ring Road. The station will have ground, concourse and platform levels. The station will have four entry and exit points, four lifts and eight escalators; there will also be a ramp to facilitate the movement of disabled people from the ground level to the concourse level. Elevation of the platforms will be about 15 m from the ground level and the total length of the platforms will be 140 m.

Layout

Facilities
 Elevator
Ticket booking Machines
Refreshmentaries
Atm

Commercial hub

Arumbakkam station is one of the five stations in the first phase of the Chennai Metro project identified to be converted into commercial hubs, the others being CMBT, Alandur, Ekkattuthangal, and Ashok Nagar. Two nine-floor buildings, measuring 51,379 sq ft and 32,721 sq ft, are proposed to be built at the Arumbakkam station.

Entry/Exit

See also

References

External links
 

 UrbanRail.Net – descriptions of all metro systems in the world, each with a schematic map showing all stations.

Chennai Metro stations
Railway stations in Chennai